Francie Molloy (born 16 December 1950) is an Irish Sinn Féin politician who has been the abstentionist Member of Parliament (MP) for Mid Ulster since 2013. He was a Member of the Northern Ireland Assembly (MLA) for Mid Ulster from 1998 to 2013.

He first stood for Sinn Féin in Fermanagh and South Tyrone in the 1982 Assembly Elections, finishing sixth in the five-seat constituency. He was then elected to Dungannon council in 1985 representing the Torrent electoral area, centred on Coalisland. He retired from the council in 1989 but was re-elected in 1993.

Molloy stood unsuccessfully for Sinn Féin in the 1994 European Parliament election.

Molloy was elected to the Northern Ireland Forum in 1996 representing Mid Ulster and then for the same constituency to the Northern Ireland Assembly in 1998, 2003 and 2007. In 2005, Molloy was temporarily suspended from Sinn Féin after publicly disagreeing with the party policy on eliminating many district councils, including the Dungannon Council of which he was a member.

In December 2012, he was selected as the Sinn Féin candidate for the UK parliamentary constituency of Mid Ulster, which had been held by his party colleague Martin McGuinness since the 1997 general election. The Mid Ulster by-election took place on 7 March 2013.

In the run-up to the by-election, media attention focussed on past allegations about Molloy and how they related to the DUP/UUP-supported independent candidate Nigel Lutton. In 2007, DUP MP David Simpson had claimed during a debate in the Westminster parliament that Molloy had been a member of the IRA and was suspected by police of being involved in the fatal shooting of Lutton's father, Frederick Lutton, on 1 May 1979. The IRA had taken responsibility for it on the basis he was an RUC reservist. The investigation came to nothing, and Simpson claimed this was because Molloy was subsequently coerced into becoming a police informant, providing information that helped break up the IRA's East Tyrone Brigade. Molloy denied the allegations and challenged anyone to repeat them outside Parliament so he could take legal action (the original speech being subject to parliamentary privilege and thus not actionable). UUP leader Mike Nesbitt said he had been unaware of the speech and that it had played no part in Lutton's selection. Lutton denied the claims were behind his decision to stand.

References

External links
 Official Website
 Profile from Northern Ireland Assembly website

1950 births
Living people
Politicians from County Tyrone
Members of the Northern Ireland Forum
Sinn Féin MLAs
Northern Ireland MLAs 1998–2003
Northern Ireland MLAs 2003–2007
Northern Ireland MLAs 2007–2011
Northern Ireland MLAs 2011–2016
Members of the Parliament of the United Kingdom for Mid Ulster
Sinn Féin MPs (post-1921)
UK MPs 2010–2015
UK MPs 2015–2017
UK MPs 2017–2019
UK MPs 2019–present
Sinn Féin councillors in Northern Ireland